San Thome Church, officially known as St Thomas Cathedral Basilica and National Shrine of Saint Thomas, is a minor basilica of the Catholic Church in India, at the Santhome neighbourhood of Chennai, in Tamil Nadu. The present structure dates to 1523 AD, when it was rebuilt by the Portuguese over the tomb of Thomas the Apostle. In 1896, it was renovated in the Madras province according to neo-Gothic designs, as was favoured by British architects in the late 19th century. It is one of the only three churches of the apostolic age of ancient Christianity, known for enshrining the tomb of an apostle and are still standing in the world today; the other two being the St Peter's Basilica in Vatican City and Santiago de Compostela Cathedral in Galicia, Spain. In antiquity, there was a basilica built over the tomb of the Apostle Philip in Hierapolis of Phrygia, present-day Pamukkale.

History

Design and construction 
In 1521, the Portuguese in Goa and Bombay-Bassein sent missionaries to Madras (Chennai) seeking the tomb of the famed Thomas the Apostle, which had become neglected or maintained nominally by Muslims, and they decided to rebuild the shrine over the tomb of the apostle. With the order and funding of King John III of Portugal they started building the church. In 1523, the structure was consecrated as a church, and Portuguese Padroado priests resumed the daily celebration of Liturgy (Holy Mass) at the site.

In 1545, St Francis Xavier visited the shrine and lived for about one year in the presbytery of the Santhome Church before he left for his mission in Ilha Formosa, the Portuguese name for the island of Taiwan. When he lived in Santhome Church he regularly prayed in front of a statue of the Virgin Mother Mary and celebrated Holy Mass; he also prayed regularly at the tomb bearing the relics of St Thomas.

British colonialism 

The church was made a cathedral in 1606 by Pope Paul V with the creation of the Diocese of Saint Thomas of Mylapore. Later the church was rebuilt with the status of cathedral in 1896 by the British in the late 19th-century style of Gothic Revival architecture. The exact place where St. Thomas was buried is marked by the second small tower in the centre of the cathedral. Pope Pius XII honoured this cathedral church, elevating it to the dignity and rank of a minor basilica in March 1956. Pope John Paul II is the only pope to have visited the church, in 1986. This church was declared as a National Shrine in 2004 by the Catholic Bishops' Conference of India. This church is also called the "National Shrine of Saint Thomas Cathedral Basilica", or as "Santhome Church". It is a very important church for worldwide Christians as it is the tomb of St. Thomas the Apostle.

Architecture
Santhome Church was built in the Gothic revival architecture style of the late 19th century. The church has a rib vault ceiling made of teak wood. It was built with 16 windows and 34 stained glass with a main stained glass in the altar representing "Saint Thomas Touching the Wound of Jesus Christ". The statue in the main altar indicates "Saint Thomas the apostle as Priest and Jesus Christ as King", with both sides the statue of Saint Thomas the Apostle and Saint Peter the Apostle. In addition, there are 14 Stations of the Cross attached at the side wall of the cathedral. The cathedral was built with teak wood, marble and granite.

There are two spires in this church :
 First spire : Acts as bell tower in the left side of church. It is 147 feet tall and can be seen from a distance.
Second spire : Was built in the center of the cathedral to indicate the tomb of Saint Thomas the Apostle.

A 200 year old British pipe organ is kept at upstairs of the church. Visitors can see the pipe organ by climbing the stairs located at the Narthex of the church.

Our Lady of Mylapore

The Portuguese statue of Mother Mary was brought from Lisbon to Santhome Church in 1523 and now it is kept at the left side of the church altar is now called as Our Lady of Mylapore.

Our Lady of Mylapore, locally known as Mylai Matha, feast is celebrated in the month of December. Second Saturday is devoted to Mylai Matha devotion, with special prayers, procession, rosary and benediction in the evening.

The wooden statue of Our Lady of Mylapore is painted in gold and placed on a special altar. Saint Francis Xavier used to spend long hours in front of this statue in prayer and deep contemplation, prayers, procession, rosary and benediction in the evening.

Pole of St. Thomas
It is believed that Apostle Saint Thomas erected this pole made out of the wood washed ashore. Faithful believe that the presence of this pole saved their life and cathedral during the devastation of a Tsunami on 26 December 2004.

Timeline

 AD 72 – Saint Thomas the Apostle died in St. Thomas Mount and buried in Mylapore (presently Santhome).
 1291 – John of Montecorvino visited the tomb in Mylapore.
 1292 – Marco Polo visited the tomb.
 14th century – Franciscan missionaries visited the tomb.
 1517 – Portuguese missionaries arrived to Mylapore.
 1522 – They started building Santhome Church.
 1523 – Santhome Church was opened.
 1545 – Saint Francis Xavier visited Santhome Church.
 1606 – Santhome Church was raised to Cathedral by Pope Paul V.
 1893 – British rebuilt the Portuguese structure (cathedral).
 1896 – Santhome Church was opened by British with the status of cathedral.
 1927 – Santhome Church was raised to minor basilica by Pope Pius XI.
 1986 – Pope John Paul II visited Santhome Church.
 1996 – Century of British structure (church) was celebrated.
 2004 – The church undergone renovation.
 2006 – Santhome Church was declared as National Shrine of India by CCBI.

Relics held in Santhome Church

 Bones of Saint Thomas the Apostle
 Spearhead that was used to kill Saint Thomas in AD 72 at St. Thomas Mount
 Holy relic of Saint Francis Xavier
 Holy relic of Saint Bartholomew the Apostle
 Holy relic of Saint Philomena

Burials in Santhome Church

 Saint Thomas the Apostle
 Bishop Louis Mathias
 Bishop Antony Devotta
 Archbishop Casimir Gnanadickam
 Archbishop Anthony Rayappa Arulappa
 Archbishop Aruldas 
 Bishop Francis Arthur Carvalho

Santhome Museum
Santhome Church has an attached museum contains lot of historical things belongs to Saint Thomas the Apostle and Santhome Church and the tomb. It has oldest Cross of 7th–8th centuries and Inscription. It is located at the backside of Santhome Church. And that is the way to enter the tomb of St. Thomas erected under Santhome Church. The museum has an information center about Saint Thomas the Apostle, Tomb of St. Thomas and about Santhome Church and more.

Currently there are two new structures one being the Tomb Chapel below the basilica and the other a museum-cum-theatre. Exclusive films on the patron saint Thomas and the church are screened twice daily for local and foreign pilgrims. The new underground chapel has a separate access from outside the church structure, allowing pilgrims and tourists to visit or pray at the tomb without disturbing the sacred proceedings in the church. Eucharistic celebrations happen every day at the fully air-conditioned tomb chapel.

Holy Eucharist Chapel
An adoration chapel adjoining the main church provides perfectly for those soulful, silent moments before the Blessed Sacrament. This chapel can be approached from the left wing of the church apart from an exclusive entrance from the outside. The day does not begin for scores of local public without a short or prolonged visit to this chapel.

Gallery

Stained glass

See also

 Roman Catholicism in India
 Saint Thomas of Mylapur
 Basilica of Our Lady of Good Health
 Poondi Matha Basilica
 Our Lady of Snows Basilica
 Christianity in India
 Christianity in Tamil Nadu
 List of churches in Chennai
 St. Thomas Mount
 Santhome

References

External links

 Official website of San Thome Church
 San Thome Church Youth Group

Roman Catholic churches completed in 1523
Roman Catholic churches completed in 1896
Basilica churches in Tamil Nadu
Roman Catholic cathedrals in Tamil Nadu
Roman Catholic churches in Chennai
Rebuilt buildings and structures in India
1523 establishments in the Portuguese Empire
Roman Catholic churches in Tamil Nadu
Tombs of apostles
19th-century Roman Catholic church buildings in India
16th-century Roman Catholic church buildings in India